Jean-Michel Martin (born 19 June 1953) is a Belgian racing driver. He won the 24 Hours of Spa four times, including twice with his younger brother Philippe in 1979 and 1980. His son Maxime also won the race in 2016. He was on the winning team of 1992 24 Hours Nürburgring.

References

1953 births
Living people
Belgian racing drivers
24 Hours of Le Mans drivers
Deutsche Tourenwagen Masters drivers
World Sportscar Championship drivers
World Touring Car Championship drivers
FIA GT Championship drivers
Blancpain Endurance Series drivers
Racing drivers from Brussels
24 Hours of Spa drivers
European Touring Car Championship drivers

Team Joest drivers
20th-century Belgian people
Boutsen Ginion Racing drivers
Lamborghini Super Trofeo drivers